Turgut Atakol (10 October 1915 – 10 April 1988) was a Turkish basketball player, referee and sports official. In 1988, he was a recipient of the Silver Olympic Order.

He played for the Galatasaray team in Istanbul. Upon retiring, he became a referee, calling many international games, including the Hungary-Czechoslovakia final of the 1955 European Championship.

He was the co-founder and president of the Turkish Basketball Federation (1958–1964), director of the organizing committee of the 1971 Mediterranean Games, secretary general of the Turkish Olympic Committee (1973–1982) and later its president (1982–1988), and member of the International Olympic Committee (1984–1988).

Turgut Atakol also wrote a book "Techniques of Basketball Refereeing", which was adopted as a guidebook by FIBA. He was enshrined in the FIBA Hall of Fame as a contributor in 2007.

References

External links
 FIBA Hall of Fame page on Atakol

1915 births
1988 deaths
Basketball players from Istanbul
Deutsche Schule Istanbul alumni
Turkish men's basketball players
FIBA Hall of Fame inductees
Galatasaray S.K. (men's basketball) players
Turkish basketball referees
Turkish referees and umpires
International Olympic Committee members
Recipients of the Olympic Order